Tharp is a crater on the Moon. Its name was adopted by the International Astronomical Union in 2015 after Marie Tharp, a geologist and oceanographer who created the first comprehensive map of the Earth's ocean floor.

References

Impact craters on the Moon